The 2009–10 Texas Longhorns men's basketball team represented the University of Texas in the 2009-10 NCAA Division I men's basketball season. Their head coach was Rick Barnes, who was in his 12th year. The team played its home games at the Frank Erwin Center in Austin, Texas and are members of the Big 12 Conference. The Longhorns finished the season 24–10, 9–7 in Big 12 play and lost in the first round of the 2010 Big 12 men's basketball tournament. They received and at–large bid to the 2010 NCAA Division I men's basketball tournament, earning an 8 seed in the East Region. They were defeated in the first round by 9 seed Wake Forest in overtime.

Recruiting

Source:

Schedule

Source:

|-
!colspan=9| Regular season

|-
!colspan=9| 2010 Big 12 men's basketball tournament

|-
!colspan=10| 2010 NCAA Division I men's basketball tournament

Rankings

Roster

References

Texas
Texas Longhorns men's basketball seasons
Texas
2009 in sports in Texas
2010 in sports in Texas